Serine/threonine-protein kinase DCLK1 is an enzyme that in humans is encoded by the DCLK1 gene.

DCLK1 is a marker for tuft cells.

References

Further reading

External links 
 

EC 2.7.11